Henry Denison (born 2 June 1810, Ossington, Nottinghamshire; died 30 November 1858, Ossington) was an English cricketer who was associated with Oxford University Cricket Club and made his first-class debut in 1829.

Denison was educated at Eton and Christ Church, Oxford. He was a fellow of All Souls College, Oxford, 1831–40. He studied law at Lincoln's Inn and was called to the bar in 1835.

References

Bibliography
 

1810 births
1858 deaths
English cricketers
English cricketers of 1826 to 1863
Oxford University cricketers
People educated at Eton College
Alumni of Christ Church, Oxford
Fellows of All Souls College, Oxford
English barristers
People from Newark and Sherwood (district)
Cricketers from Nottinghamshire